Escape from Red Rock is a 1957 American Western film written and directed by Edward Bernds. The film stars Brian Donlevy, Eilene Janssen, Gary Murray, Jay C. Flippen, William Edward Phipps and Myron Healey. The film was released in December 1957, by 20th Century Fox.

Plot

Cast 
Brian Donlevy as Bronc Grierson
Eilene Janssen as Janie Acker
Gary Murray as Cal Bowman
Jay C. Flippen as Sheriff John Costaine
William Edward Phipps as Arky Shanks
Myron Healey as Joe Skinner 
Nesdon Booth as Pete Archer 
Dan White as Al Farris 
Al Baffert as Guard 
Court Shepard as Rube Boyce 
Tina Menard as Maria Chavez
Natividad Vacío as Don Miguel Chavez
Zon Murray as Krug
Rick Vallin as Judd Bowman
Ed Hinton as Tarrant
Frosty Royce as Stage driver
Frank Richards as Price
Linda Dangcil as Elena Chavez
Eumenio Blanco as The Mayor
Elena Da Vinci as Antonia Chavez
Hank Patterson as Sheriff Grover
Eileen Stevens as Mrs. Donnelly
Frank Marlowe as Manager
Joe Becker as Clerk
Dick Crockett as Krug henchman

Production
Production started 29 July 1957.

References

External links 
 
Escape from Red Rock at BFI

1957 films
20th Century Fox films
American Western (genre) films
1957 Western (genre) films
Films directed by Edward Bernds
1950s English-language films
1950s American films